Yüceli is a village in the Kızıltepe District of Mardin Province in Turkey. The village is predominantly populated by Kurds of the Xurs tribe. It had a population of 1,142 in 2021.

Arabs constitute one quarter of the village.

References 

Villages in Kızıltepe District
Kurdish settlements in Mardin Province